Gillian Mary Lorraine (28 December 1926 – 19 June 2018), known professionally as Gillian Raine, was a British actress and singer. She was married to actor Leonard Rossiter from 1964 until his death in 1984; they had one daughter, Camilla (b. 1972).

Raine appeared in repertory theatre, TV drama and film productions. Her theatre works included Hedda Gabler (as Juliana Tesman), 2005, at The Duke of York's Theatre, Richard Eyre's production of La Grande Magia for the National Theatre, Mike Bradwell’s Mackerel Sky at the Bush Theatre and Bill Bryden’s production of A Month in the Country at the Yvonne Arnaud Theatre and in the West End at the Albery Theatre. Film work included Darling and A Night to Remember and on television Kiss Me Kate, Vanity Fair, A Very Peculiar Practice and Under the Hammer.  She met Rossiter when they were both appearing in the play Semi-Detached in 1962 at the Belgrade Theatre, Coventry. 

Leonard's marriage to Josephine Tewson had ended in 1961. During the play's second run at the Belgrade, in September 1963, Leonard and Gillian fell in love and started to live together, although they did not marry until 1972. Semi-Detached subsequently played briefly on Broadway in October 1963. She played the part of Phyllis Bennett in the 1987 TV Series, The Charmer starring Nigel Havers, and appeared as Harriet Longthorn in New Tricks (S5:E3, "A Face for Radio," 2008). She died in 2018 at the age of 91.

Filmography

References

External links

1926 births
2018 deaths
British actresses
British stage actresses
British television actresses
People from Colombo